The 2021 Chicago Sky season was the franchise's 16th season in the Women's National Basketball Association (WNBA). This was their third season under head coach James Wade. In the postseason, the Sky won their first WNBA championship.

The offseason was marked by two-time WNBA MVP Candace Parker joining the team. The Sky started the season with two wins but followed with a seven-game losing streak through mid-June. However, they proceeded to go on a seven-game winning streak that included back-to-back wins over eventual top seed Connecticut. They entered the mid-season Olympic break with a 10–10 record. After the break, they recorded a 4–3 record in August, including back-to-back road wins in Seattle. In September, they began with a road loss and closed out the season with a four game home-stand that they split 2–2, finishing the season 16–16.

The Sky entered the playoffs as the sixth seed. They hosted the Dallas Wings in the First Round, and won in dominating fashion 81–64. They faced the Minnesota Lynx on the road in the Second Round, winning the game 89–76. Facing the first-seeded Connecticut Sun in a best-of-three semifinals series, they won the Game 1 in a double overtime thriller but lost Game 2 on the road. The series returned home to Chicago, where the Sky won both games to win the series 3–1.

The Sky reached the Finals for the first time since 2014. They were only the third team to reach the finals with a record of .500 or below, and the lowest seed to do so since the new playoff format was introduced in 2016. In the WNBA Finals, the Sky defeated the Phoenix Mercury in four games to win their first WNBA championship. Their only loss came in overtime in Game 2.

Transactions

WNBA Draft 
The Sky made the following selections in the 2021 WNBA Draft on December 4, 2020.

Trades and Roster Changes

Roster

Game log

Preseason 

|- style="background:#fcc;"
| 1
| May 9
| @ Indiana
| L 65–82
| Kahleah Copper (14)
| Boyd-JonesMack (6)
| Brittany Boyd-Jones (3)
| Bankers Life FieldhouseNo Fans
| 0–1
|- style="background:#cfc;"
| 2
| May 11
| Indiana
| W 83–70
| Astou Ndour-Fall (13)
| Candace Parker (6)
| Brittany Boyd-Jones (5)
| Wintrust ArenaNo Fans
| 1–1

Regular season 

|- style="background:#cfc;"
| 1
| May 15
| @ Washington
| W 70–56
| Kahleah Copper (19)
| ParkerCopper (8)
| Diamond DeShields (5)
| Entertainment and Sports Arena1,050
| 1–0
|- style="background:#cfc;"
| 2
| May 19
| @ Atlanta
| W 85–77
| Kahleah Copper (23)
| Astou Ndour-Fall (11)
| Courtney Vandersloot (8)
| Gateway Center Arena689
| 2–0
|- style="background:#fcc;"
| 3
| May 23
| New York
| L 85–93
| Diamond DeShields (22)
| Ruthy Hebard (10)
| Courtney Vandersloot (16)
| Wintrust Arena1,332
| 2–1
|- style="background:#fcc;"
| 4
| May 25
| Atlanta
| L 83–90
| Kahleah Copper (21)
| DeShieldsNdour-Fall (9)
| Courtney Vandersloot (6)
| Wintrust Arena1,004
| 2–2
|- style="background:#fcc;"
| 5
| May 28
| Los Angeles
| L 61–76
| Diamond DeShields (14)
| Astou Ndour-Fall (9)
| Courtney Vandersloot (6)
| Wintrust Arena1,124
| 2–3
|- style="background:#fcc;"
| 6
| May 30
| Los Angeles
| L 79–82
| Courtney Vandersloot (28)
| Astou Ndour-Fall (12)
| Courtney Vandersloot (7)
| Wintrust Arena1,124
| 2–4

|- style="background:#fcc;"
| 7
| June 1
| Phoenix
| L 83–84
| Diamond DeShields (26)
| Ruthy Hebard (9)
| Courtney Vandersloot (10)
| Wintrust Arena1,217
| 2–5
|- style="background:#fcc;"
| 8
| June 3
| @ Phoenix
| L 74–77
| Kahleah Copper (14)
| Kahleah Copper (8)
| Courtney Vandersloot (9)
| Phoenix Suns Arena3,819
| 2–6
|- style="background:#fcc;"
| 9
| June 5
| @ Los Angeles
| L 63–68
| Kahleah Copper (15)
| Ruthy Hebard (10)
| Courtney Vandersloot (5)
| Los Angeles Convention Center430
| 2–7
|- style="background:#cfc;"
| 10
| June 9
| Indiana
| W 92–76
| Courtney Vandersloot (17)
| Ruthy Hebard (9)
| Courtney Vandersloot (9)
| Wintrust Arena1,090
| 3–7
|- style="background:#cfc;"
| 11
| June 12
| @ Indiana
| W 83–79
| Candace Parker (20)
| Candace Parker (14)
| Courtney Vandersloot (5)
| Indiana Farmers ColiseumNo Fans
| 4–7
|- style="background:#cfc;"
| 12
| June 15
| @ Minnesota
| W 105–89
| Allie Quigley (23)
| Candace Parker (7)
| Courtney Vandersloot (13)
| Target Center2,024
| 5–7
|- style="background:#cfc;"
| 13
| June 17
| Connecticut
| W 81–75
| Kahleah Copper (18)
| CopperParker (8)
| Courtney Vandersloot (10)
| Wintrust Arena1,293
| 6–7
|- style="background:#cfc;"
| 14
| June 19
| Connecticut
| W 91–81
| Courtney Vandersloot (18)
| Kahleah Copper (9)
| Courtney Vandersloot (11)
| Wintrust Arena1,293
| 7–7
|- style="background:#cfc;"
| 15
| June 22
| @ New York
| W 92–72
| Candace Parker (23)
| Candace Parker (12)
| Courtney Vandersloot (10)
| Barclays Center1,419
| 8–7
|- style="background:#cfc;"
| 16
| June 24
| @ New York
| W 91–68
| CopperDeShields (18)
| Candace Parker (11)
| Courtney Vandersloot (9)
| Barclays Center2,148
| 9–7
|- style="background:#fcc;"
| 17
| June 27
| @ Connecticut
| L 58–74
| CopperQuigley (11)
| DeShieldsDolson (6)
| Courtney Vandersloot (7)
| Mohegan Sun Arena2,014
| 9–8
|- style="background:#cfc;"
| 18
| June 30
| @ Dallas
| W 91–81
| Kahleah Copper (17)
| Candace Parker (10)
| Courtney Vandersloot (12)
| College Park Center1,778
| 10–8

|- style="background:#fcc;"
| 19
| July 2
| @ Dallas
| L 91–100
| Candace Parker (22)
| Candace Parker (7)
| Courtney Vandersloot (9)
| College Park Center2,187
| 10–9
|- style="background:#fcc;"
| 20
| July 10
| Washington
| L 85–89 (OT)
| Stefanie Dolson (20)
| Candace Parker (13)
| Courtney Vandersloot (15)
| Wintrust Arena8,331
| 10–10

|- style="background:#cfc;"
| 21
| August 15
| Seattle
| W 87–85
| Kahleah Copper (19)
| Candace Parker (9)
| Courtney Vandersloot (11)
| Wintrust Arena6,231
| 11–10
|- style="background:#fcc;"
| 22
| August 17
| Dallas
| L 76–80
| Allie Quigley (27)
| DolsonParker (6)
| Courtney Vandersloot (12)
| Wintrust Arena3,902
| 11–11
|- style="background:#fcc;"
| 23
| August 21
| Minnesota
| L 95–101
| QuigleyVandersloot (27)
| Allie Quigley (5)
| Courtney Vandersloot (8)
| Wintrust Arena5,036
| 11–12
|- style="background:#cfc;"
| 24
| August 24
| @ Atlanta
| W 86–79
| Allie Quigley (21)
| Candace Parker (9)
| Courtney Vandersloot (10)
| Gateway Center Arena1,292
| 12–12
|- style="background:#cfc;"
| 25
| August 27
| @ Seattle
| W 73–69
| Kahleah Copper (26)
| Azurá Stevens (10)
| Courtney Vandersloot (8)
| Angel of the Winds Arena3,650
| 13–12
|- style="background:#cfc;"
| 26
| August 29
| @ Seattle
| W 107–75
| Candace Parker (25)
| ParkerStevens (9)
| Courtney Vandersloot (10)
| Angel of the Winds Arena3,750
| 14–12
|- style="background:#fcc;"
| 27
| August 31
| @ Phoenix
| L 83–103
| Kahleah Copper (18)
| Azurá Stevens (9)
| ParkerVandersloot (4)
| Phoenix Suns Arena5,838
| 14–13

|- style="background:#fcc;"
| 28
| September 2
| @ Las Vegas
| L 83–90
| Candace Parker (30)
| Candace Parker (14)
| Courtney Vandersloot (8)
| Michelob Ultra ArenaN/A
| 14–14
|- style="background:#cfc;"
| 29
| September 5
| Las Vegas
| W 92–84
| Allie Quigley (22)
| Candace Parker (13)
| Candace Parker (8)
| Wintrust Arena5,210
| 15–14
|- style="background:#fcc;"
| 30
| September 12
| Washington
| L 71–79
| Azurá Stevens (18)
| Candace Parker (11)
| Courtney Vandersloot (6)
| Wintrust Arena4,707
| 15–15
|- style="background:#fcc;"
| 31
| September 17
| Las Vegas
| L 70–103
| Candace Parker (20)
| Azurá Stevens (6)
| Courtney Vandersloot (6)
| Wintrust Arena4,911
| 15–16
|- style="background:#cfc;"
| 32
| September 19
| Indiana
| W 98–87
| Diamond DeShields (30)
| Allie Quigley (8)
| Diamond DeShields (6)
| Wintrust ArenaN/A
| 16–16

Playoffs 

|- style="background:#cfc;"
| 1
| September 23
| Dallas
| W 81–64
| Kahleah Copper (23)
| Candace Parker (15)
| Candace Parker (7)
| Wintrust Arena4,672
| 1–0

|- style="background:#cfc;"
| 1
| September 26
| @ Minnesota
| W 89–76
| Courtney Vandersloot (19)
| Kahleah Copper (10)
| Courtney Vandersloot (5)
| Target Center4,334
| 1–0

|- style="background:#cfc;"
| 1
| September 28
| @ Connecticut
| W 101–95 (2OT)
| Candace Parker (22)
| Courtney Vandersloot (10)
| Courtney Vandersloot (18)
| Mohegan Sun Arena4,720
| 1–0
|- style="background:#fcc;"
| 2
| September 30
| @ Connecticut
| L 68–79
| Kahleah Copper (13)
| Candace Parker (7)
| Courtney Vandersloot (6)
| Mohegan Sun Arena6,088
| 1–1
|- style="background:#cfc;"
| 3
| October 3
| Connecticut
| W 86–83
| Kahleah Copper (26)
| Azurá Stevens (11)
| Courtney Vandersloot (13)
| Wintrust Arena7,421
| 2–1
|- style="background:#cfc;"
| 4
| October 6
| Connecticut
| W 79–69
| Courtney Vandersloot (19)
| Candace Parker (9)
| Candace Parker (7)
| Wintrust Arena
| 3-1

|- style="background:#cfc;"
| 1
| October 10
| @ Phoenix
| W 91–77
| Kahleah Copper (21)
| Kahleah Copper (10)
| Courtney Vandersloot (11)
| Footprint Center10,191
| 1–0
|- style="background:#fcc;"
| 2
| October 13
| @ Phoenix
| L 86–91 (OT)
| Courtney Vandersloot (20)
| CopperParkerStevens (9)
| Courtney Vandersloot (14)
| Footprint Center13,685
| 1–1
|- style="background:#cfc;"
| 3
| October 15
| Phoenix
| W 86–50
| Kahleah Copper (22)
| Azurá Stevens (6)
| Courtney Vandersloot (10)
| Wintrust Arena10,378
| 2–1
|- style="background:#cfc;"
| 4
| October 17
| Phoenix
| W 80–74
| Allie Quigley (26)
| Candace Parker (13)
| Courtney Vandersloot (15)
| Wintrust Arena10,378
| 3–1

Standings

Playoffs

Statistics 

Source:

Regular Season

Awards and honors

References

External links 

 Official website of the Chicago Sky

Chicago Sky
Chicago Sky seasons
Chicago Sky
Women's National Basketball Association championship seasons